is a subway station on the Sendai Subway Tōzai Line in Wakabayashi-ku, Sendai, Japan, operated by the municipal subway operator Sendai City Transportation Bureau.

Lines
The station is numbered "T10".

Station layout
The station has one island platform serving two tracks on the second basement ("B2F") level. The ticket barriers are located on the first basement ("B1F") level.

Platforms

Gallery

Staffing
The station is staffed and operated by sub-contracted employees from the security company Alsok.

History
The station opened on 6 December 2015, coinciding with the opening of the Tōzai Line.

Passenger statistics
In fiscal 2015, the station was used by an average of 3,941 passengers daily.

Surrounding area
 Seiwa Gakuen High School Yakushido Campus
 Mutsu Kokubun-ji Yakushidō temple
 Miyagi Baseball Stadium

See also
 List of railway stations in Japan

References

External links

 

Sendai Subway Tozai Line
Railway stations in Sendai
Railway stations in Japan opened in 2015